Sven Delblanc ( May 26, 1931 - December 15, 1992) was Swedish author and professor of literature. 

Born in Swan River, Manitoba, Canada, Deblanc died in Gottsunda Parish, Uppsala, and is buried in Hammarby kyrkogård in Uppsala, Sweden.

Delblanc was an Associate Professor in the history of literature at Uppsala University since 1965. He received the Aftonbladet Literature Prize in 1965. Before his death he was pointed out as the anonymous writer Bo Balderson.

He was born in Canada but grew up near Vagnhärad, Sweden. His parents divorced and the father, Siegfried Axel Herman Delblanc, remarried. His paternal grandfather, Friedrich Hermann Delblanc, a bookmaker in Stockholm, was from Leipzig, Saxony, Germany. Sven Delblanc's maternal relatives were from Väse in Värmland in the West of Sweden. His maternal grandmother came from Norway. His maternal grandfather, Axel Nordfält, was the inspiration to the character Samuel in Samuels bok (1981).

The Swedish television series Hedebyborna (1978) is based on Delblanc's series of novels Åminne (1970), Stenfågel (1973), Vinteride (1974) and Stadsporten (1976).

Bibliography

Television
 1968 – Lekar i kvinnohagen (manuscript)
 1978 – Hedebyborna (manuscript)
 1986 – Prästkappan (book)
 1990 – Kära farmor (manuscript)
 1992 – Maskeraden (manuscript)

Theater
 Kastrater (1977)

Awards and merits
 Aftonbladets litteraturpris (1965)
 BMF-plaketten (1970)
 Svenska Dagbladets litteraturpris (1970)
 Litteraturfrämjandets stora romanpris(1970)
 Zornpriset (1970)
 Sixten Heymans pris (1974)
 BMF-plaketten (1981)
 Nordiska rådets litteraturpris (1982) for Samuels bok
 Övralidspriset (1985)
 Pilotpriset (1986)
 Kellgrenpriset (1989)
 Augustpriset (1991) for Livets ax
 BMF-plaketten (1991)
 Gerard Bonniers pris (1992)

Footnotes

External links
 
 Sven Delblanc Society
 

1931 births
1992 deaths
20th-century Swedish novelists
Swedish-language writers
Writers from Manitoba
People from Swan River, Manitoba
Nordic Council Literature Prize winners
Litteris et Artibus recipients
Swedish male novelists
20th-century Swedish male writers